Walter Cyril Lawson BCL (February 1, 1889 – 1970) was a lawyer, notary public and political figure in the Province of New Brunswick, Canada. He represented Sunbury County in the Legislative Assembly of New Brunswick from 1935 to 1944 as a Liberal member.

Biography
He was born in Norton Station, New Brunswick, the son of John James Lawson and Annie C. Upham. Lawson was educated at Acadia University and King's College Law School. In 1925, he married Mary Josephine Kearney. Lawson was a member of the council for Sunbury County from 1927 to 1931. He served in the Canadian Expeditionary Force during World War I.

His brother Gordon R. Lawson also served in the provincial assembly.

References 
 Canadian Parliamentary Guide, 1937, AL Normandin

1889 births
1970 deaths
Canadian military personnel of World War I
Acadia University alumni
University of King's College alumni
Lawyers in New Brunswick
New Brunswick Liberal Association MLAs
Canadian Anglicans
People from Sunbury County, New Brunswick
New Brunswick municipal councillors
Canadian notaries
University of New Brunswick Faculty of Law alumni